SM U-38 was a German Type U 31 U-boat which operated in the Mediterranean Sea during World War I. It ended up being the third most successful U-boat participating in the war, sinking 134 merchant ships sunk for a total of 287,811 GRT.

Its longest serving captain was Kptlt. Max Valentiner, who was awarded the Pour le Mérite while in command of U-38.

In 1917 Valentiner was succeeded as commander of U-38 by Kptlt. Wilhelm Canaris, who decades later became an Admiral and head of the Abwehr (German Military Intelligence), in 1935–1944.

Design
German Type U 31 submarines were double-hulled ocean-going submarines similar to Type 23 and Type 27 subs in dimensions and differed only slightly in propulsion and speed. They were considered very good high sea boats with average manoeuvrability and good surface steering.

The U-boat was armed with four  torpedo tubes, two fitted in the bow and two in the stern, and carried 6 torpedoes. Additionally U-38 was equipped in 1915 with one  Uk L/30 deck gun, which was replaced with a  gun in 1916/17.
The boat's complement was 4 officers and 31 enlisted.

Fate
After World War I ended, U-38 was surrendered to France and docked in Brest in 1919, and then broken up.

Summary of raiding history

See also 
Room 40

References

Notes

Citations

Bibliography

Eberhard Rössler: Geschichte des deutschen U-Bootbaus – Band 1. Bernard & Graefe Verlag 1996, 
Bodo Herzog: Deutsche U-Boote 1906-1966. Manfred Pawlak Verlags GmbH, Herrschingen 1990,

External links

Homepage for Christian August Max Ahlmann Valentiner: 
Photos of cruises of German submarine U-54 in 1916-1918. Great photo quality, comments in German.
A 44 min. film from 1917 about a cruise of the German submarine U-35. A German propaganda film without dead or wounded; many details about submarine warfare in World War I.

Room 40:  original documents, photos and maps about World War I German submarine warfare and British Room 40 Intelligence from The National Archives, Kew, Richmond, UK.

German Type U 31 submarines
U-boats commissioned in 1914
World War I submarines of Germany
1914 ships
Ships built in Kiel